Timothé Luwawu-Cabarrot (born 9 May 1995) is a French professional basketball player for Olimpia Milano of the Italian Lega Basket Serie A (LBA) and the EuroLeague. He was selected with the 24th overall pick by the Philadelphia 76ers in the 2016 NBA draft.

Professional career

Olympique Antibes (2012–2015)
Between 2012 and 2014, Luwawu-Cabarrot played a total of five games for the Antibes Sharks. In January 2014 he signed his first pro deal with Antibes, and in 2014–15, he became a full squad member for the first time. In 42 games for Antibes in 2014–15, he averaged 7.1 points, 2.5 rebounds, 1.6 assists, and 1.1 steals per game. He also helped the team win the LNB Pro B Leaders Cup. He originally planned to enter the 2015 NBA draft, but ultimately did not.

Mega Leks (2015–2016)
On 5 July 2015, Luwawu-Cabarrot signed with Mega Leks of Serbia for the 2015–16 season. He helped the club win the Serbian Cup, and at the season's end, he earned All-ABA League Team honours. In 28 ABA League games for Mega Leks, he averaged 14.6 points, 4.8 rebounds, 2.8 assists and 1.7 steals per game.

Philadelphia 76ers (2016–2018)
In April 2016, Luwawu-Cabarrot declared for the 2016 NBA draft. He was subsequently selected with the 24th overall pick in the draft by the Philadelphia 76ers. On 3 July 2016, he signed his rookie scale contract with the 76ers and joined the team for the 2016 NBA Summer League. On 29 October 2016, he made his NBA debut in a 104–72 loss to the Atlanta Hawks, recording one rebound, one assist and one steal in six minutes off the bench. On 1 February 2017, he made the first start of his career in place of the injured Robert Covington and scored seven points in a 113–95 loss to the Dallas Mavericks. On 12 March 2017, he scored a season-high 18 points in a 118–116 win over the Los Angeles Lakers. On 31 March 2017, he set a new season high with 19 points in a 122–105 loss to the Cleveland Cavaliers. Two days later, he had a 23-point effort in a 113–105 loss to the Toronto Raptors. On 10 April 2017, he scored a season-best 24 points in a 120–111 loss to the Indiana Pacers. During his rookie season, he had multiple assignments to the Delaware 87ers of the NBA Development League.

Oklahoma City Thunder (2018–2019)
On 25 July 2018, Luwawu-Cabarrot was traded to the Oklahoma City Thunder in a three-team deal involving the 76ers and the Atlanta Hawks.

Chicago Bulls (2019)
On 1 February 2019, Luwawu-Cabarrot was traded with cash considerations to the Chicago Bulls in exchange for a protected 2020 second-round draft pick.

Brooklyn Nets (2019–2021)
On 30 September 2019, Luwawu-Cabarrot joined the Cleveland Cavaliers for training camp and played two preseason games before being waived.

On 23 October 2019, Luwawu-Cabarrot signed a two-way contract with the Brooklyn Nets. On 15 January 2020, the Nets announced that they had signed Luwawu-Cabarrot to a 10-day contract. On 25 January, he was signed to a second 10-day contract. On 7 February, Luwawu-Cabarrot signed a multi-year contract with the Nets.

Atlanta Hawks (2021–2022)
On 22 September 2021, Luwawu-Cabarrot signed with the Atlanta Hawks.

Return to Europe (2022–present)
On 24 September 2022, Luwawu-Cabarrot signed with the Phoenix Suns. After appearing in three preseason games, Luwawu-Cabarrot was waived on October 15, 2022.

On November 19, 2022, Luwawu-Cabarrot made his return to Europe, signing with Italian and EuroLeague powerhouse Olimpia Milano in order to replace the injured Shavon Shields.

National team career
Luwawu-Cabarrot played for the junior French national basketball teams in both the 2014 FIBA Europe Under-20 Championship, and the 2015 FIBA Europe Under-20 Championship. In 2015, he helped France to a semifinals appearance, while averaging 11.6 points and 4.9 rebounds per game. Luwawu-Cabarrot was a member of the French national basketball team that finished second in the 2020 Tokyo Olympics. In the gold medal match versus the United States men's basketball team, Luwawu-Cabarrot scored 11 points in the losing effort, earning a silver medal. .

Personal life
Luwawu-Cabarrot was born in France, and is of Congolese descent through his father.

NBA career statistics

Regular season

|-
| style="text-align:left;"|
| style="text-align:left;"|Philadelphia
| 68 || 19 || 17.2 || .402 || .311 || .854 || 2.2 || 1.1 || .5 || .1 || 6.4
|-
| style="text-align:left;"|
| style="text-align:left;"|Philadelphia
| 52 || 7 || 15.5 || .375 || .335 || .793 || 1.4 || 1.0 || .2 || .1 || 5.8
|-
| style="text-align:left;" rowspan="2"|
| style="text-align:left;"|Oklahoma City
| 21 || 1 || 5.9 || .302 || .227 || .667 || .9 || .2 || .2 || .0 || 1.7
|-
| style="text-align:left;"|Chicago
| 29 || 6 || 18.8 || .394 || .330 || .771 || 2.7 || .8 || .5 || .2 || 6.8
|-
| style="text-align:left;"|
| style="text-align:left;"|Brooklyn
| 47 || 2 || 18.1 || .435 || .388 || .852 || 2.7 || .6 || .4 || .1 || 7.8
|-
| style="text-align:left;"|
| style="text-align:left;"|Brooklyn
| 58 || 7 || 18.1 || .365 || .314 || .814 || 2.2 || 1.2 || .6 || .1 || 6.4
|-
| style="text-align:left;"|
| style="text-align:left;"|Atlanta
| 52 || 18 || 13.2 || .398 || .361 || .854 || 1.6 || .8 || .3 || .1 || 4.4
|- class="sortbottom"
| style="text-align:center;" colspan="2"|Career
| 328 || 60 || 16.0 || .391 || .335 || .829 || 2.0 || .9 || .4 || .1 || 5.9

Playoffs

|-
| style="text-align:left;"|2020
| style="text-align:left;"|Brooklyn
| 4 || 3 || 32.8 || .339 || .333 || .917 || 3.8 || 1.5 || .8 || .0 || 16.0
|-
| style="text-align:left;"|2021
| style="text-align:left;"|Brooklyn
| 7 || 0 || 3.6 || .300 || .333 || — || .4 || .3 || .0 || .0 || 1.1
|-
| style="text-align:left;"|2022
| style="text-align:left;"|Atlanta
| 4 || 0 || 5.5 || .500 || .333 || — || .8 || .5 || .0 || .0 || 1.3
|- class="sortbottom"
| style="text-align:center;" colspan="2"|Career
| 15 || 3 || 11.9 || .342 || .333 || .917 || 1.4 || .7 || .2 || .0 || 5.1

See also
 List of foreign basketball players in Serbia
 List of NBA drafted players from Serbia

References

External links

 Timothé Luwawu-Cabarrot at aba-liga.com

1995 births
Living people
Atlanta Hawks players
Basketball players at the 2020 Summer Olympics
Black French sportspeople
Brooklyn Nets players
Chicago Bulls players
Delaware 87ers players
French expatriate basketball people in Italy
French expatriate basketball people in Serbia
French expatriate basketball people in the United States
French men's basketball players
French sportspeople of Democratic Republic of the Congo descent
KK Mega Basket players
Long Island Nets players
Medalists at the 2020 Summer Olympics
National Basketball Association players from France
Oklahoma City Thunder players
Olimpia Milano players
Olympic basketball players of France
Olympic medalists in basketball
Olympic silver medalists for France
Olympique Antibes basketball players
Philadelphia 76ers draft picks
Philadelphia 76ers players
Shooting guards
Small forwards
Sportspeople from Cannes